Demonarosa rufotessellata is a moth of the family Limacodidae. It is found on Borneo, as well as in India, Nepal, Myanmar, Thailand, Laos, Vietnam, the Philippines, Taiwan and Japan.

Subspecies
Demonarosa rufotessellata rufotessellata
Demonarosa rufotessellata subrosea (Wileman, 1915) (Taiwan)
Demonarosa rufotessellata issiki (Kawazoe & Ogata, 1962) (Japan)

References

Moths described in 1879
Limacodidae
Moths of Japan
Moths of Asia
Taxa named by Frederic Moore